Qavamabad (also Romanized as Qavāmābād; also known as ‘Alīābād) is a village in Razmavaran Rural District, in the Central District of Rafsanjan County, Kerman Province, Iran. At the 2006 census, its population was 632, in 155 families.

References 

Populated places in Rafsanjan County